The Loti (plural: Maloti) is the currency of the Kingdom of Lesotho. It is subdivided into 100 lisente (sg. sente). It is pegged to the South African rand on a 1:1 basis through the Common Monetary Area, and both are accepted as legal tender within Lesotho. The loti was first issued in 1966, albeit as a non-circulating currency. In 1980, Lesotho issued its first coins denominated in both loti and lisente (dated 1979) to replace the South African rand, but the rand remains legal tender.

The name derives from the Sesotho loti, "mountain," while sente is from English "cent".

In 1985, the ISO 4217 code was changed from  into .

Coins

In 1980, coins dated 1979 were introduced in denominations of 1 sente, 2, 5, 10, 25 and 50 lisente and 1 loti. In 1996, 2 and 5 maloti coins were introduced, followed by 20 lisente in 1998.

Coins in circulation are:
 5 lisente
 10 lisente
 20 lisente
 50 lisente
 1 loti
 2 maloti
 5 maloti

Banknotes

In January 1980, banknotes dated 1979 (the last two digits of the year of issue are the serial number prefix denominator) were introduced in denominations of 2, 5 and 10 maloti. 20 and 50 maloti notes were added in 1981, followed by 100 and 200 maloti in 1994.

On 1 March 2011, at a celebration marking its 30th anniversary, the Central Bank of Lesotho launched a new series of banknotes dated 2010 aimed at fighting the spread of counterfeits. The notes feature a portrait of the three royal family members: the current king, His Majesty Letsie III, is in the middle, his father King Moshoeshoe II is on the left, and the founder of the Basotho nation, King Moshoeshoe I, on the right.

See also
 Economy of Lesotho

References

External links
 Central Bank of Lesotho's official website
 The banknotes of Lesotho 

Currencies of Africa
Circulating currencies
Currencies of the Commonwealth of Nations
Fixed exchange rate
Currencies introduced in 1966
Currencies introduced in 1980
Economy of Lesotho